Let's Love While We Can is the thirty-seventh studio album by American pop singer Andy Williams, released in the U.K. in 1980 by CBS Records. For this project Williams eschews covering well-known pop hits and standards and relies mostly on original or lesser-known country songs.

On June 21, 2004, Let's Love While We Can became available as one of two albums on one CD by Sony Music Distribution, the other album being Williams's Columbia release from the fall of 1974, You Lay So Easy on My Mind.  Two songs from this album, "Jason" and "I'll Never Love Anyone Anymore", were included as bonus tracks on the 2002 CD release of Williams's previous album, Andy.

Track listing

Side one
 "Let's Love While We Can" (Ronny Scaife) - 2:49
 "Only Everything" (Randy Goodrum) - 3:32
 "Jason" (Deborah Kay Hupp, Robert E. Morrison) - 3:12
 "Beside Me" (Randy Goodrum) - 2:24
 "If You Were a Singer" (Marty Cooper) - 3:29
 "Railway Hotel" (Mike Batt) - 3:11

Side two
 "I Don't Want to Be in Love" (Charlie Black, Rory Michael Bourke) - 3:31
 "Love Is a Cold Wind" (Charlie Black, Rory Michael Bourke) - 3:53
 "Regrets" (Barbara Myrick) - 3:15
 "If I Reach for You" (Charlie Black, Mike Lawler) - 3:37
 "It Was Time" (Barry Mann, Cynthia Weil) - 4:13
 "I'll Never Love Anyone Anymore" (Laurie Andrew, Cedric Chiles) - 2:46

Song information

Barbara Fairchild entered the Country singles chart with "Let's Love While We Can" in the issue of Billboard magazine dated May 10, 1975, and reached number 52 over the course of 10 weeks. "Railway Hotel" first appeared on Mike Batt's 1977 album Schizophonia, and "Love Is a Cold Wind" was recorded by Roy Orbison for his 1979 album Laminar Flow. "Beside Me" by Steve Wariner made its first appearance on the Country singles chart in the August 4, 1979, issue of Billboard and got as high as number 60 during its seven weeks there. James Brown's recording of "Regrets" debuted on the Billboard R&B chart in the issue of the magazine dated January 26, 1980, and began a six-week run that took the song to number 63, and Kenny Rankin entered the Adult Contemporary chart with the song six months later, in the July 19 issue, and peaked at number 33 during his seven weeks there.

Personnel
From the liner notes for the original album:

Andy Williams - vocals
Dick Peirce - producer
Billy Sherrill - engineer
Bill Justis - arrangements
Yvonne Hodges - background vocals
Donna McElroy - background vocals
Lewis Nunley - background vocals
Steve Pippin - background vocals
Wendy Suits - background vocals
Dennis Wilson - background vocals
Gil Wright - background vocals
Mary Ann Kennedy - female vocal solo ("Regrets")
Slick Lawson - cover photo
Keats Tyler - back cover photo
Simon Cantwell - design

Musicians

David Briggs - piano
Jimmy Capps - acoustic & rhythm guitars
Jerry Carrigan - drums & percussion
Chuck Cochran - piano
Pete Drake - steel guitar
Ray Edenton - acoustic & rhythm guitars
Shane Keister - keyboards
The Ron Keller Brass - brass
Dave Kirby - acoustic & rhythm guitars
Jerry Kroon - drums & percussion
The Sheldon Kurland Strings - strings
Mike Lawler - synthesizer
Kenny Malone - drums & percussion
Bob Moore - bass
Roger Morris - keyboards
Leon Rhodes - electric guitar
Hargus "Pig" Robbins - piano
Billy Sanford - electric guitar
Jerry Shook - acoustic & rhythm guitars
Jack Solomon - acoustic & rhythm guitars
Pete Wade - electric guitar
Recorded at Jack Clement Recording Studio, Nashville, Tennessee

References

Bibliography

1980 albums
Andy Williams albums
Columbia Records albums